The Christian Party of Austria (CPÖ; formerly the Christians – ) is a minor political party in Austria, founded on 15 October 2005.

It changed its name under its new chairman Rudolf Gehring in late 2009, partially due to concerns by the Catholic Church over the use of the term "Christians" to mean only the party.

History
The party was registered on 23 January 2006, and presented to the public on 27 September 2007, when it announced a popular initiative ("Volksbegehren") on the topic of children and families and that it would contest the 2008 election in Lower Austria.

In the 2008 parliamentary election, the party received 0.64% of the vote.

Rudolf Gehring, the party's chairman, announced he would run for president in the 2010 election. He received 5.44% of the vote for third place, the party's highest vote percentage in a national election to date.

Goals
The party is oriented mainly on Christian politics, advocating, for example:

 Revoking the recognition of same-sex unions
 Giving parents the right to vote for their children
 Maintaining Christian symbols in schools
 Outlawing (or maintaining the illegality of) abortion, euthanasia, stem cell research and artificial insemination
 Protection of the belief in a Creator God, stating that the importance of this belief "demands respect from other creeds and atheists" as well 
 A rejection of further EU centralization
 A rejection of illegal immigration

Election results

National Council

President

References

External links
Official homepage

Christian political parties
Catholic political parties
Political parties established in 2005
Conservative parties in Austria
2005 establishments in Austria